Beinn Bhuidhe (855m) is a mountain in the Northwest Highlands of Scotland. It lies in a very remote area of Knoydart, Lochaber.

Lying on the north side of Loch Nevis, it offers an fine walk to its summit. The nearest village is Inverie.

References

Mountains and hills of the Northwest Highlands
Marilyns of Scotland
Corbetts